John Louis Sarrao (born February 1, 1967) is an American physicist. He is the deputy director for science, technology, and engineering at Los Alamos National Laboratory.

Education 
In 1993, Sarrao received his PhD in Physics from the University of California Los Angeles following a M.S. in Physics from UCLA in 1991 and a B.S. in Physics from Stanford University in 1989.

He is a Fellow of the American Association for the Advancement of Science; the American Physical Society; and the Los Alamos National Laboratory.

Career 
He is the principal architect of LANL’s Dynamic Mesoscale Material Science Capability (DMMSC).

He is a board member of the Technology Research Collaborative (TRC).

Sarrao's research includes quantum computing.

On June 7, 2018, Sarrao presented Congressional Testimony for the House Science, Space & Technology Committee Subcommittee on Energy on topics including electric grid research and big data.

Honors and awards 
In 2013, he was awarded the United States Department of Energy’s Ernest Orlando Lawrence Award for his research in Condensed Matter and Materials Science: “For the discovery and study of new materials, especially those based on Plutonium, advancing understanding of unconventional magnetic and superconducting states in strongly correlated f-electron condensed matter systems.”

He was honored for his discovery and study of new materials, especially those based on Plutonium, that advance understanding of novel magnetic and superconducting states in strongly correlated f-electron condensed matter systems. The complexity of strongly correlated materials, resulting from coupling among charge, spin, and lattice degrees-of-freedom, allows the emergence of new states and new phenomena, helping promote the development of useful and novel functional materials.

References 

21st-century American physicists
1967 births
Living people
Fellows of the American Physical Society
Los Alamos National Laboratory personnel
University of California, Los Angeles alumni
20th-century American physicists
Fellows of the American Association for the Advancement of Science
Stanford University alumni